The Potatuck were a Native American tribe in Connecticut. They were related to the Paugussett people, historically located during and prior to the colonial era in western Connecticut. They lived in what is now Newtown, Woodbury and Southbury of Fairfield County, and along the whole Housatonic River, including the Schaghticoke tribe. 
One of their last sites of habitation, Little Pootatuck Brook Archeological Site, is listed on the National Register of Historic Places. After losses due to epidemics and warfare, they merged in the early 18th century with other remnant Native American groups in the area, forming the Schaghticoke tribe.

Name 
The Potatuck have also been listed as Poodatook, Pootatook, Potatuck, Pudaduc, and Pudatuck in historical literature.

Subsistence 
Like neighboring tribes such as the Paugusset, the Potatuck were a farming and fishing culture. The women cultivated varieties of their staple crops, such as corn, squash, and beans, as well as the tobacco valued for ritual use. They also gathered berries, nuts, and other natural resources. The men fished in freshwater much of the year, and hunted deer and small game. They may have traveled to the coast of Long Island Sound to fish from saltwater in summer months.

Post-encounter history 

Many of the remnant Potatuck merged with survivors of the Weantinock, Mohegan, and other Indigenous peoples of the Northeastern Woodlands, after losses due to epidemics and warfare from European colonization pressures. They formed the Schaghticoke tribe in western Connecticut and eastern New York. The Connecticut colony granted them a 2,500-acre reservation in 1736, with territory on both sides of the Housatonic River. Through the 19th and early 2-th centuries, state-appointed agents sold off essentially all the land to the east, reducing the reservation to about 400 acres of territory on the west bank of the river.

Descendants 
These descendants are part of the Schaghticoke Tribal Nation, which recognized as a tribe by the state of Connecticut, but not federally recognized as a Native American tribe by the US Department of the Interior. In 2011, the Schaghticoke Tribal Nation was recognized by a state court as the governing authority and legitimate legal successor to the historic tribe.

References

Native American history of Connecticut
Native American tribes in Connecticut
History of Fairfield County, Connecticut